Rush Communications Ltd. was a Cable TV provider in the rural sections of Nova Scotia. It also provides broadband internet access. The company was bought out by EastLink effective September 1, 2007.

Areas of Operation
Cape Breton
 Along Trunk 19
 Port Hawkesbury
 Richmond County
 Eskasoni
 Mainland Nova Scotia
 Annapolis Valley
 Canso Strait Area
 Canso
 Clare
 Enfield
 Elmsdale
 Milford
 Shubenacadie

Defunct cable and DBS companies of Canada
Telecommunications companies of Canada
Internet service providers of Canada
Companies based in Nova Scotia
Year of establishment missing
Companies disestablished in 2007
2007 disestablishments in Nova Scotia